Pursuit to Algiers (1945) is the twelfth entry in the Basil Rathbone/Nigel Bruce Sherlock Holmes film series of fourteen. Elements in the story pay homage to an otherwise unrecorded affair mentioned by Dr. Watson at the beginning of the 1903 story "The Adventure of the Norwood Builder", notably the steamship Friesland. Off-camera, Watson also recounts to his audience another unrecorded affair mentioned in the 1924 story "The Adventure of the Sussex Vampire", that of the Giant Rat of Sumatra, "a story for which the world is not yet prepared".

Plot
About to leave London for a much-needed holiday, Sherlock Holmes and Dr. Watson receive a cryptic invitation. Intrigued, Holmes accepts and is met by the prime minister of Rovenia [Rovinia], who begs him to escort Prince Nikolas home. His father has been assassinated, and as his heir, Nikolas is now king. Holmes agrees.

Arrangements have already been made for an airplane. When it develops engine problems, a smaller replacement only has room for the prince and Holmes, leaving Watson behind. When Watson protests, Holmes suggests that he follow on a passenger ship bound for Algiers.

On the voyage, Watson reads that the airplane has crashed in the Pyrenees and that it is unlikely that there are any survivors. Holmes, however, has an aversion to plans made by others and is aboard the ship with Nikolas. He instructs Watson to introduce the prince to the other passengers as his nephew. Though Watson suspects everyone, from singer Sheila Woodbury to exercise fanatic Agatha Dunham to a secretive pair who later turn out to be archeologists, of being killers, it is not until the ship makes an unscheduled stop at Lisbon that the real Soviet agents come aboard: Gregor, circus knife-thrower Mirko, and a hulking mute named Gubec.

First, Mirko tries to kill Holmes by throwing a knife through a porthole, then Gregor substitutes an explosive party favor, but Holmes foils both attempts. Finally, the villains succeed in kidnapping the prince when they dock at Algiers, only for Holmes to reveal that the "prince" was a decoy; the real prince had been posing as a steward, hidden in plain sight the whole time. The decoy Nikolas is later recovered unharmed.

Cast 
 Basil Rathbone as Sherlock Holmes
 Nigel Bruce as Dr. Watson
 Marjorie Riordan as Sheila Woodbury
 Rosalind Ivan as Agatha Dunham
 Morton Lowry as Steward
 Leslie Vincent as Prince Nikolas, a.k.a. "Nikolas Watson"
 Martin Kosleck as Mirko
 Rex Evans as Gregor
 John Abbott as Jodri
 Gerald Hamer as Kingston
 William 'Wee Willie' Davis as Gubec
 Tom Dillon as Restaurant Owner
 Frederick Worlock as Prime Minister
 Sven Hugo Borg as Johansson

Reception
Universal Studios film director Roy Neill delivers a tongue-in-check version of the Sherlock Holmes film genre in Pursuit to Algiers in which even the actors "seem aware they are trapped within a genre picture."

This "camp" portrayal of the famous detective exaggerates every virtue of Conan Doyle's literary creation, with Neill and Rathbone issuing a burlesque reveling in Holmes unerring expertise in everything” ranging from the "Moorish architecture of Lisbon" to "recognizing a knife-thrower glimpsed at an obscure Parisian circus" and perfectly identifying "suspicious foreigners" based on their "gravely flawed fashion sense."

Footnotes

References
Schwartzman, Theresa. 2004. Pursuit to Algiers, 1945. UCLA Film and Television Archive: 12th Festival of Preservation, July 22-August 21, 2004. Festival guest publication.

External links 
 
 
 
 

1945 films
1945 mystery films
American mystery films
American black-and-white films
American detective films
Films directed by Roy William Neill
Films set on ships
Sherlock Holmes films
Universal Pictures films
Films set in London
Films set in Algiers
1940s English-language films
1940s American films